Springdale is an unincorporated area and census-designated place (CDP) in Prince George's County, Maryland, United States. Per the 2020 census, the population was 5,301.

Geography
Springdale is located at  (38.937244, −76.845734).

Demographics

2020 census

Note: the US Census treats Hispanic/Latino as an ethnic category. This table excludes Latinos from the racial categories and assigns them to a separate category. Hispanics/Latinos can be of any race.

2000 Census
At the 2000 census there were 2,645 people, 836 households, and 699 families in the CDP. The racial makeup of the CDP was 2.72% White, 92.29% African American, 0.26% Native American, 1.74% Asian, 0.08% Pacific Islander, 0.83% from other races, and 2.08% from two or more races. Hispanic or Latino of any race were 1.59%.

Of the 836 households 44.4% had children under the age of 18 living with them, 63.5% were married couples living together, 15.7% had a female householder with no husband present, and 16.3% were non-families. 12.4% of households were one person and 2.5% were one person aged 65 or older. The average household size was 3.16 and the average family size was 3.40.

The age distribution was 30.9% under the age of 18, 6.4% from 18 to 24, 32.6% from 25 to 44, 24.4% from 45 to 64, and 5.7% 65 or older. The median age was 35 years. For every 100 females, there were 94.1 males. For every 100 females age 18 and over, there were 87.9 males.

The median household income was $82,341 and the median family income  was $81,811. Males had a median income of $45,731 versus $42,326 for females. The per capita income for the CDP was $28,119. About 1.4% of families and 3.0% of the population were below the poverty line, including 5.6% of those under age 18 and none of those age 65 or over.

Government
Prince George's County Police Department District 2 Station in Brock Hall CDP, with a Bowie postal address, serves the community.

Education
Springdale is within the Prince George's County Public Schools. Zoned schools are Ardmore Elementary School, Ernest Everett Just Middle School, and Charles H. Flowers High School.

References

Census-designated places in Prince George's County, Maryland
Census-designated places in Maryland
Washington metropolitan area